This is a list of bridges in Guizhou, China.

Bridges

Azhihe River Bridge
Baling River Bridge
Beipan River Guanxing Highway Bridge
Beipan River Hukun Expressway Bridge
Beipan River Shuibai Railway Bridge
Chajiaotan Bridge
Dimuhe River Bridge
Duge Bridge
Fenglin Bridge under construction
Hutiaohe Bridge
Jiangjiehe Bridge
Liuchong River Bridge
Liuguanghe Bridge
Luojiaohe Bridge
Maling River Shankun Expressway Bridge
Najiehe Railway Bridge
Pingtang Bridge
Qinglong Railway Bridge
Qingshui River Bridge
Wujiang Viaduct
Xixi Bridge
Yachi Railway Bridge
Yachi River Bridge
Zhaozhuang Bridge under construction
Zhuchanghe River Bridge
Zongxihe Bridge
Zunyi Bridge

See also
List of bridges in China

References

Bridges in Guizhou
Guizhou